Angiopteris is a genus of huge evergreen ferns from the family Marattiaceae, found throughout the paleotropics from Madagascar to the South Pacific islands. Species of smaller stature with elongate synangia and creeping rhizomes are sometimes segregated into the genus Archangiopteris, and a once-pinnate monotypic segregate genus has been called Macroglossum, but molecular data supports inclusion of these taxa within a broad concept of Angiopteris.

Angiopteris evecta has been introduced and naturalized in Hawaii, Jamaica, and parts of Central America, where it has become an invasive weed in lower elevation drainages. They feature a large, erect, woody rhizome with a wide base supported by thick roots.

Angiopteris is unique among ferns in having explosively dispersed spores, thought to be caused by the cavitation of an airspace between spore layers.

The basal chromosome number for this genus is 2n=80. The type species is Angiopteris evecta.

Species
Angiopteris taxonomy is poorly understood, with nearly 200 poorly defined species having been named, only a small handful of which are recognized in modern floras. , World Ferns recognized the following species:

Angiopteris angustifolia C.Presl
Angiopteris annamensis C.Chr. & Tardieu
Angiopteris bipinnata (Ching) J.M.Camus
Angiopteris brooksii Copel.
Angiopteris cadierei (C.Chr. & Tardieu) Govaerts & Christenh.
Angiopteris cartilagidens Christ
Angiopteris caudatiformis Hieron.
Angiopteris chingii J.M.Camus
Angiopteris chongsengiana Senterre & I.Fabre
Angiopteris cochinchinensis de Vriese
Angiopteris confertinervia Ching ex C.Chr. & Tardieu
Angiopteris crassipes Wall.
Angiopteris danaeoides Z.R.He & Christenh.
Angiopteris dianyuecola Z.R.He & W.M.Chu
Angiopteris elliptica Alderw.
Angiopteris evecta (G.Forst.) Hoffm. (Giant king fern)
Angiopteris ferox Copel.
Angiopteris fokiensis Hieron.
Angiopteris helferiana C.Presl
Angiopteris hokouensis Ching
Angiopteris holttumii C.Chr.
Angiopteris itoi (W.C.Shieh) J.M.Camus
Angiopteris javanica C.Presl
Angiopteris latipinna (Ching) Z.R.He, W.M.Chu & Christenh.
Angiopteris lygodiifolia Rosenst.
Angiopteris madagascariensis de Vriese
Angiopteris marchionica E.D.Br.
Angiopteris microura Copel.
Angiopteris oblanceolata Ching & Chu H.Wang
Angiopteris opaca Copel.
Angiopteris paucinervis W.M.Chu & Z.R.He
Angiopteris pruinosa Kunze
Angiopteris rapensis E.D.Br.
Angiopteris remota Ching & Chu H.Wang
Angiopteris smithii Racib.
Angiopteris somae (Hayata) Makino & Nemoto
Angiopteris sparsisora Ching
Angiopteris subcuspidata Rosenst.
Angiopteris subrotundata (Ching) Z.R.He & Christenh.
Angiopteris sugongii Gui L.Zhang, J.Y.Xiang & Ting Wang
Angiopteris tamdaoensis (Hayata) J.Y.Xiang & T.Wang
Angiopteris tonkinensis (Hayata) J.M.Camus
Angiopteris undulatostriata Hieron.
Angiopteris versteegii Alderw.
Angiopteris wangii Ching
Angiopteris winkleri Rosenst.
Angiopteris yunnanensis Hieron.

Phylogeny of Angiopteris

References

Marattiidae
Fern genera